Dry Branch Creek is a tributary of the Tohickon Creek in Richland Township, Bucks County, Pennsylvania in the United States. Dry Branch is part of the Delaware River watershed.

Statistics

Course
Its average slope is 17.7 feet per mile (2.75 meters per kilometers). In a study conducted in 2001 by the Pennsylvania Department of Conservation and Natural Resources Rivers Conservation Program, Dry Branch Creek was found to be impaired in condition and caused extensive flooding during severe storms at the Raub Road crossing.

Stream progression
 Dry Branch Creek
 Tohickon Creek
 Delaware River

Crossings and bridges
 Erie Road
 Raub Road
 Union Road
 Beck Road
 West Sawmill Road
 Meadow Road
 Pennsylvania Route 212 (Church Road)

References

Rivers of Bucks County, Pennsylvania
Rivers of Pennsylvania
Tributaries of Tohickon Creek